Rip This is the third studio album by Bass Drum of Death. It was released in October 2014 under Innovative Leisure.

Track list
All songs written by John Barrett.

Personnel
Bass Drum of Death
 John Barrett – guitars, lead vocals
 Len Clark - drums

Technical
Jacob Portrait - Engineer, Mixing, Producer
Fred Kevorkian - Mastering

Photography
Brock Fetch - Cover Photo

References

External links

2014 albums
Bass Drum of Death albums